Sarah Kazemy (born 26 October 1987) is a French actress. She is best known for her role in the independent film Circumstance.

Early life
Sarah was born in Neuilly sur Seine, France to an Iranian father and Algerian mother. She grew up in France and studied law, Arabic, German and Italian before becoming an actress.

Career

She had no experience in acting when she was asked to play one of the leads in the 2011 Iranian independent film Circumstance, in which she plays a young woman who discovers her sexuality and develops a lesbian relationship. She prepared for the role by staying with her relatives in Tehran, to gain personal experience from the situation there. Soon after she was cast as the female lead in the film Kanyamakan.

Filmography

References

External links

 
 Stars of Iranian film discuss forbidden love: An interview with Circumstance's Nikohl Boosheri and Sarah Kazemy Seattle Gay News

1987 births
French people of Iranian descent
French people of Algerian descent
Living people
Actresses from Paris
French film actresses
People from Neuilly-sur-Seine
21st-century French actresses
Iranian diaspora film people